is a Japanese mystery light novel series written by Nanako Tsujimura and illustrated by Utako Yukihiro. Shueisha has published eleven main volumes  since 2015 under their Shueisha Orange Bunko imprint, as well as two collections of short stories. A manga adaptation with art by Mika Akatsuki has been serialized in Ichijinsha's shōjo manga magazine Monthly Comic Zero Sum since November 28, 2019. An anime television series adaptation by Shuka premiered from January 9 to March 26, 2020.

Structure

The series is organized into three distinct arcs, each marked by a time skip and with distinct narrative styles. The first arc encompasses the first six volumes. Each are divided into four distinct cases each named after a gemstone and featuring specific customers, with a bonus case matching the format but much shorter at the end. They are told almost exclusively from Seigi's first-person perspective.

After a two-year time skip between volumes six and seven, the novel format changes for volumes seven to 10 to add a short prologue from Richard's voice in first person before returning to Seigi, and each book is divided into chapters covering days instead of distinct short stories or novellas involving specific gems and customers. The novels in arc two are much more holistic stories.

After another three year time skip, volume 11 picks up with a short prologue from Seigi and then follows a new narrator named Minoru in third person. The case format is back, but no longer named after gemstones but characters. Seigi also receives a short "half case" to narrate at the end focusing on himself and Richard.

Plot

The first volume opens with Seigi Nakata on his way home from work as a security guard, where he runs into a beautiful foreign man named Richard being attacked by drunkards. He rushes to Richard's rescue and joins him at the police station to take a report, where Richard reveals that he is an Englishman working in Japan as a jeweler. Once they're both free to go home, Seigi stops Richard and asks if he appraises jewelry.

Seigi then brings a ring he inherited from his grandmother to Richard in hopes of having the gemstone identified. When he eventually hears back about the ring, Richard informs him that the ring was stolen many decades ago. Seigi laughs in relief, having already known that and hoping Richard could help him find the owner. By a twist of fate, Richard is acquainted with the owner and brings Seigi to see her. There, the woman listens to the story of Seigi's poor pickpocket grandmother and returns the ring to him with her blessing.

Following this adventure, Richard offers Seigi a job at his jewelry shop and Seigi happily accepts and begins his employment under Richard. There, Seigi learns about the world he's never been exposed to before, different kinds of people, and most importantly, himself. He and Richard grow closer while helping customers together and helping each other with their own struggles, and become friends and later partners in both life and work.

Themes

The series covers a number of themes around identity, self-acceptance, prejudice, and love. Many of the customers, and Seigi himself, are dealing uncertain of who they are and how best to make themselves happy under society's pressures, and Richard typically helps them find their way and encourages them to be themselves.

The series also includes a number of queer characters starting in volume one and showcases their struggles on center stage, from a lesbian woman in volume one, to members of Richard's own family, to Richard and Seigi's intense devotion to each other that doesn't fit into any easily named and defined category.  This defiance of boundaries expected by society is a recurring idea throughout the novels.

In the first volume case "The Ruby of Truth", while discussing a lesbian customer who features in the case, Richard says, "Generalizing whole groups of individuals as 'people like that' is an act of barbarity akin to caging someone's soul." In The Coral of Encounters, Richard describes his jewelry shop as a "castle" where people can, if only briefly, be safe from prejudice and accepted for who they are.

Characters

 
A shrewd jeweler who has customers worldwide, Richard is an androgynous stone-cold beauty—or so he appears at first. Seigi likens him to a “living jewel.” Richard is a polyglot  who speaks fluent Japanese even better than some native Japanese speakers and at least a dozen other languages across the novels. He offers Seigi a part-time job when opening his jewelry store “Jewelry Etranger” in Ginza. He is an extremist when it comes to tea with milk and also an acknowledged sweets junkie. He was born and raised in England with summers visiting Provence, France to see his French mother, Catherine.

Seigi is a college student who wishes to be a public servant. As his name “Seigi” (Japanese meaning: justice) shows, he has a strong sense of justice. Asking Richard for an appraisal on a jewel leads him to work as a part-time employee for Jewelry Etranger. Seigi is friendly and honest to a fault at times. He is skilled at household chores as a whole, and his specialty is pudding.

One of Seigi's classmates from college. She is very knowledgeable on mineralogy, having studied it in high school and often provides Seigi insight on the subject. Seigi has feelings for her, but has a hard time admitting his feelings. Tanimoto, however, is asexual and aromantic and does not return his feelings but for friendship, and they settle into a close platonic relationship as the series progresses. She has an interest in teaching science to young middle school students.

One of Seigi's friends from college. His role differs dramatically between the novels and anime, as each chapter he was present in the novels was removed from the anime adaptation and he replaced a number of other minor characters from others. He is in general quite supportive of Seigi's pursuits. He is heavily interested in music and eventually moves to Spain to pursue flamenco guitar.

 Jeffrey is Richard's elder cousin on his father's side and was raised with him like a brother. Until Richard was in college, he considered Jeffrey to be the most important person in his life. Jeffrey supports Richard and Seigi through both financial means and investigation information.
	

 Henry is Richard's elder cousin and Jeffrey's older brother. He favors the piano, and is the only Claremont to not speak Japanese on his introduction, although he does pick it up later. During Richard's college years, he suffered an illness that still affects him years later. He becomes the tenth Earl Claremont after the death of his father.

 Saul is a Sri Lankan man who serves as Richard's mentor and boss. He gave his last name to Richard for use after helping Richard recover from past trauma.

Media

Light novel

Manga
A manga adaptation illustrated by Mika Akatsuki began serialization in Ichijinsha's Monthly Comic Zero Sum magazine on November 26, 2019. The manga is licensed in English by Seven Seas Entertainment.

Anime
An anime television series adaptation was announced on August 7, 2019. The series is animated by Shuka and directed by Tarou Iwasaki, with Mariko Kunisawa handling series composition, Natsuko Kondou designing the characters, and Nobuko Toda composing the series' music. It premiered from January 9 to March 26, 2020 on AT-X, Tokyo MX, BS11, and Wowow. Nagi Yanagi performed the series' opening theme song "Hōseki no Umareru Toki", while Da-ice performed the series' ending theme song "Only for you." It is streamed by Crunchyroll worldwide, excluding Asia. In Southeast Asia, Muse Communication licensed the series and streamed it on Muse Asia YouTube channel. It ran for 12 episodes.

In addition, 6 volumes of drama CD, taking place after the final episode, were released between May 27 and July 22, 2020.

Reception
By June 2020, it was announced together with the launch of the 10th novel volume that the total number of copies of the previous 9 volumes had exceeded 700,000.

Notes

References

External links
 

2020 anime television series debuts
2015 Japanese novels
Anime and manga based on light novels
AT-X (TV network) original programming
Crunchyroll anime
Ichijinsha manga
Light novels
Muse Communication
Mystery anime and manga
Seven Seas Entertainment titles
Shōjo manga
Shueisha books